Leicester City Hockey Club is a field hockey club based in Leicester, England, who play their home games at St. Margaret's Pastures. The ladies side has produced a number of international players and is recognised as one of the most successful clubs in England having won six league titles.

Teams
The ladies team was established in 1894 and the men's section was launched in 2018.

The club currently fields five ladies teams, two men's teams and various youth teams.

The ladies 1st XI play in the Women's England Hockey League.  The men's teams, and the remainder of the ladies teams, play in the Midlands League.

The Academy
Leicester City Hockey Club recently launched their junior academy with training, matches and tournaments for junior players aged 6-18. The club is well-known for producing high class players, who often go on to achieve international honours. The academy is a more professional structure to junior development. Plenty of opportunities for recreational hockey, as well as for elite players. Emphasis is on the team, friendships and loyalty. Leicester City Hockey Club is a fully inclusive club, with all coaches and volunteers DBS checked and is ClubMark Accredited - a robust club certification, showing high standards of coaching and management, within a safe environment for all players. Young players are encouraged to take qualifications in coaching and umpiring.

Honours
 Women's England Hockey League
Winners: 1993–94, 2000–01, 2004–05, 2005–06, 2006–07, 2011–12: 6
Women's National Cup
Winners: 1992–93, 2004–05, 2007–08, 2009–10: 4
Women's Super Cup
Winners: 2005–06
EuroHockey Club Champions Trophy
Winners: 2014

Notable players

Women's internationals

References

English field hockey clubs
Field hockey clubs established in 1894
Sports clubs established in 1885
1894 establishments in England
Sport in Leicester